The RD-214 (GRAU Index 8D59) was a liquid rocket engine, burning AK-27I (a mixture of 73% nitric acid and 27% N2O4 + iodine passivant  and TM-185 (a kerosene and gasoline mix) in the gas generator cycle. As was the case with many V-2 influenced engines, the single turbine was driven by steam generated by catalytic decomposition of H2O2. It also had four combustion chambers and vector control was achieved by refractory vanes protruding into the nozzle's exhaust.

Development
For the requirements to have storable propellants and higher thrust, Glushko's OKB-456 developed the RD-211, which had four combustion chambers, each having twice the thrust of the RD-100, a Russian adaptation of the V-2 A-4 engine. The four chambers were fed from a single turbopump powered by steam generated from catalytic decomposition of H2O2. When then came the requirement for the Buran cruise missile project, a version for that application was developed in the RD-212. Both RD-211 and RD-212 proved too weak for the application and the project were abandoned for the RD-213 for Buran. When Yangel's OKB-586 was tasked with developing the first storable propellant ballistic missile in the Soviet arsenal, the RD-211 proved too weak. Thus, the project was definitely abandoned and the more powerful RD-214 was developed. While Korolev's refusal to use toxic propellants basically left him out of the ballistic missile development race, the basic design of the RD-211 also served as basis for the RD-107/RD-108 engine, which went to be the most flown rocket engines in history.

The initial R-12 was a pad launched missile. It had significant operative issues on readiness and vulnerability. Thus, the silo launched R-12U was developed. For this development the RD-214U was developed. When Yangel used the R-12U as the basis for the Kosmos-2 63S1, the RD-214F was developed and fire tested, but in the end the stock R-12U was used as first stage. So it was for all subsequent 63S1M and 11K63.

Versions
This engine many versions:
RD-211: GRAU Index 8D57. Original design for the R-12. Based on the RD-100, itself an adaptation of the V-2 A4 engine. This engine already had four separate combustion chambers, an H2O2 steam driven turbine and required vanes in the exhaust to control the rocket.
RD-212: GRAU Index 8D41. Originally developed from the RD-211 for the Buran cruise missile project. Project drop in favor of RD-213 due to insufficient thrust.
RD-213: GRAU Index 8D13. Similar to the RD-214. Developed for the Buran cruise missile project. Cancelled with the project.
RD-214: GRAU Index 8D59. Original version of the engine designed for the R-12 (8K63).
RD-214U: GRAU Index 8D59. Improved version of the engine. Flew on the R-12U (8K63S) and Kosmos-2 (11K63) launch vehicle.
RD-214F: GRAU Index 11D45. Project for the initial version of Kosmos-2 (63S1).

See also

R-12 Dvina - Ballistic missile for which this engine was originally developed for.
Kosmos-2 - launch vehicle that uses an R-12 as first stage.
Rocket engine using liquid fuel

References

External links 
 NPO Energomash official site.

Rocket engines of the Soviet Union
Rocket engines using the gas-generator cycle
Rocket engines using hypergolic propellant
Energomash rocket engines